The 2015 Oklahoma State Cowboys baseball team will represent Oklahoma State University during the 2015 NCAA Division I baseball season. The Cowboys will play their home games at Allie P. Reynolds Stadium as a member of the Big 12 Conference. They will be led by head coach Josh Holliday, in his third season at Oklahoma State.

Previous season
In 2014, the Cowboys finished the season as champions of the Big 12 with a record of 48–18, 18–6 in conference play. They qualified for the 2014 Big 12 Conference baseball tournament, and were eliminated in the finals. They qualified for the 2014 NCAA Division I baseball tournament, and were selected as hosts of the Stillwater Regional, being placed with Nebraska, Cal State Fullerton, and Binghamton. In their opening game, the Cowboys shut-out Binghamton, 8–0. In their second game, they defeated Cal State Fullerton by a score of 13–7. In the regional final, the Cowboys again defeated Cal State Fullerton, this time by a score of 6–4. They advanced to the Super Regional, of which they were hosts, to play UC Irvine. In the first game, the Anteaters defeated the Cowboys, 8–4, and then won Game Two in a shutout, 1–0, to advance to the College World Series.

Personnel

Roster

Coaching staff

Schedule

! style="background:#FF6600;color:white;"| Regular Season
|- valign="top" 

|- align="center" bgcolor=""
| 1 || February 13 || at #19  || #5 || Phoenix Municipal Stadium • Phoenix, AZ ||  ||  ||  ||  ||  ||  ||
|- align="center" bgcolor=""
| 2 || February 14 || at #19 Arizona State || #5 || Phoenix Municipal Stadium • Phoenix, AZ ||  ||  ||  ||  ||  ||  ||
|- align="center" bgcolor=""
| 3 || February 15 || at #19 Arizona State || #5 || Phoenix Municipal Stadium • Phoenix, AZ ||  ||  ||  ||  ||  ||  ||
|- align="center" bgcolor=""
| 4 || February 19 || vs. Oregon State || #10 || Surprise Stadium • Surprise, AZ ||  ||  ||  ||  ||  ||  ||
|- align="center" bgcolor=""
| 5 || February 20 || vs.  || #10 || Surprise Stadium • Surprise, AZ ||  ||  ||  ||  ||  ||  ||
|- align="center" bgcolor=""
| 6 || February 21 || vs.  || #10 || Sloan Park • Mesa, AZ ||  ||  ||  ||  ||  ||  ||
|- align="center" bgcolor=""
| 7 || February 22 || vs.  || #10 || Peoria Sports Complex • Peoria, AZ ||  ||  ||  ||  ||  ||  ||
|- align="center" bgcolor=""
| 8 || February 25 ||  || #10 || Allie P. Reynolds Stadium • Stillwater, OK ||  ||  ||  ||  ||  ||  ||
|- align="center" bgcolor=""
| 9 || February 27 ||  || #10 || Allie P. Reynolds Stadium • Stillwater, OK ||  ||  ||  ||  ||  ||  ||
|- align="center" bgcolor=""
| 10 || February 28 || Western Illinois || #10 || Allie P. Reynolds Stadium • Stillwater, OK ||  ||  ||  ||  ||  ||  ||
|-

|- align="center" bgcolor=""
| 11 || March 1 || Western Illinois || #10 || Allie P. Reynolds Stadium • Stillwater, OK ||  ||  ||  ||  ||  ||  ||
|- align="center" bgcolor=""
| 12 || March 3 ||  || #14 || Allie P. Reynolds Stadium • Stillwater, OK ||  ||  ||  ||  ||  ||  ||
|- align="center" bgcolor=""
| 13 || March 4 || UNLV || #14 || Allie P. Reynolds Stadium • Stillwater, OK ||  ||  ||  ||  ||  ||  ||
|- align="center" bgcolor=""
| 14 || March 6 || #27  || #14 || Allie P. Reynolds Stadium • Stillwater, OK ||  ||  ||  ||  ||  ||  ||
|- align="center" bgcolor=""
| 15 || March 7 || #27 Illinois || #14 || Allie P. Reynolds Stadium • Stillwater, OK ||  ||  ||  ||  ||  ||  ||
|- align="center" bgcolor=""
| 16 || March 8 || #27 Illinois || #14 || Allie P. Reynolds Stadium • Stillwater, OK ||  ||  ||  ||  ||  ||  ||
|- align="center" bgcolor=""
| 17 || March 10 ||  || #23 || Allie P. Reynolds Stadium • Stillwater, OK ||  ||  ||  ||  ||  ||  ||
|- align="center" bgcolor=""
| 18 || March 11 || Alcorn State || #23 || Allie P. Reynolds Stadium • Stillwater, OK ||  ||  ||  ||  ||  ||  ||
|- align="center" bgcolor=""
| 19 || March 13 ||  || #23 || Allie P. Reynolds Stadium • Stillwater, OK ||  ||  ||  ||  ||  ||  ||
|- align="center" bgcolor=""
| 20 || March 14 || Grand Canyon || #23 || Allie P. Reynolds Stadium • Stillwater, OK ||  ||  ||  ||  ||  ||  ||
|- align="center" bgcolor=""
| 21 || March 15 || Grand Canyon || #23 || Allie P. Reynolds Stadium • Stillwater, OK ||  ||  ||  ||  ||  ||  ||
|- align="center" bgcolor=""
| 22 || March 17 ||  || #19 || Allie P. Reynolds Stadium • Stillwater, OK ||  ||  ||  ||  ||  ||  ||
|- align="center" bgcolor=""
| 23 || March 20 || at #1 TCU || #19 || Lupton Stadium • Fort Worth, TX ||  ||  ||  ||  ||  ||  ||
|- align="center" bgcolor=""
| 24 || March 21 || at #1 TCU || #19 || Lupton Stadium • Fort Worth, TX ||  ||  ||  ||  ||  ||  ||
|- align="center" bgcolor=""
| 25 || March 22 || at #1 TCU || #19 || Lupton Stadium • Fort Worth, TX ||  ||  ||  ||  ||  ||  ||
|- align="center" bgcolor=""
| 26 || March 24 ||  || #12 ||  Allie P. Reynolds Stadium • Stillwater, OK||  ||  ||  ||  ||  ||  ||
|- align="center" bgcolor=""
| 27 || March 27 || Kansas State || #12 || Allie P. Reynolds Stadium • Stillwater, OK ||  ||  ||  ||  ||  ||  ||
|- align="center" bgcolor=""
| 28 || March 28 || Kansas State || #12 || Allie P. Reynolds Stadium • Stillwater, OK ||  ||  ||  ||  ||  ||  ||
|- align="center" bgcolor=""
| 29 || March 29 || Kansas State || #12 || Allie P. Reynolds Stadium • Stillwater, OK ||  ||  ||  ||  ||  ||  ||
|- align="center" bgcolor=""
| 30 || March 31 || at  || #11 || J. L. Johnson Stadium • Tulsa, OK ||  ||  ||  ||  ||  ||  ||
|-

|- align="center" bgcolor=""
| 31 || April 3 || #23 Texas || #11 || Allie P. Reynolds Stadium • Stillwater, OK ||  ||  ||  ||  ||  ||  ||
|- align="center" bgcolor=""
| 32 || April 4 || #23 Texas || #11 || Allie P. Reynolds Stadium • Stillwater, OK ||  ||  ||  ||  ||  ||  ||
|- align="center" bgcolor=""
| 33 || April 5 || #23 Texas || #11 || Allie P. Reynolds Stadium • Stillwater, OK ||  ||  ||  ||  ||  ||  ||
|- align="center" bgcolor=""
| 34 || April 7 || Oklahoma || #9 || Allie P. Reynolds Stadium • Stillwater, OK ||  ||  ||  ||  ||  ||  ||
|- align="center" bgcolor=""
| 35 || April 10 || at Kansas || #9 || Hoglund Ballpark • Lawrence, KS ||  ||  ||  ||  ||  ||  ||
|- align="center" bgcolor=""
| 36 || April 11 || at Kansas || #9 || Hoglund Ballpark • Lawrence, KS ||  ||  ||  ||  ||  ||  ||
|- align="center" bgcolor=""
| 37 || April 12 || at Kansas || #9 || Hoglund Ballpark • Lawrence, KS ||  ||  ||  ||  ||  ||  ||
|- align="center" bgcolor=""
| 38 || April 14 || Oral Roberts || #10 || Allie P. Reynolds Stadium • Stillwater, OK ||  ||  ||  ||  ||  ||  ||
|- align="center" bgcolor=""
| 39 || April 17 || Baylor || #10 || Allie P. Reynolds Stadium • Stillwater, OK ||  ||  ||  ||  ||  ||  ||
|- align="center" bgcolor=""
| 40 || April 18 || Baylor || #10 || Allie P. Reynolds Stadium • Stillwater, OK ||  ||  ||  ||  ||  ||  ||
|- align="center" bgcolor=""
| 41 || April 19 || Baylor || #10 || Allie P. Reynolds Stadium • Stillwater, OK ||  ||  ||  ||  ||  ||  ||
|- align="center" bgcolor=""
| 42 || April 21 || #22  || #9 || Allie P. Reynolds Stadium • Stillwater, OK ||  ||  ||  ||  ||  ||  ||
|- align="center" bgcolor=""
| 43 || April 24 || at Texas Tech || #9 || Rip Griffin Park • Lubbock, TX ||  ||  ||  ||  ||  ||  ||
|- align="center" bgcolor=""
| 44 || April 25 || at Texas Tech || #9 || Rip Griffin Park • Lubbock, TX ||  ||  ||  ||  ||  ||  ||
|- align="center" bgcolor=""
| 45 || April 26 || at Texas Tech || #9 || Rip Griffin Park • Lubbock, TX ||  ||  ||  ||  ||  ||  ||
|- align="center" bgcolor=""
| 46 || April 28 ||  || #11 || Allie P. Reynolds Stadium • Stillwater, OK ||  ||  ||  ||  ||  ||  ||
|-

|- align="center" bgcolor=""
| 47 || May 1 || vs. #25 Oklahoma || #11 || ONEOK Field • Tulsa, OK ||  ||  ||  ||  ||  ||  ||
|- align="center" bgcolor=""
| 48 || May 2 || vs. #25 Oklahoma || #11 || Chickasaw Bricktown Ballpark • Oklahoma City, OK  ||  ||  ||  ||  ||  ||  ||
|- align="center" bgcolor=""
| 49 || May 3 || vs. #25 Oklahoma || #11 || Chickasaw Bricktown Ballpark • Oklahoma City, OK ||  ||  ||  ||  ||  ||  ||
|- align="center" bgcolor=""
| 50 || May 8 || West Virginia || #12 || Allie P. Reynolds Stadium • Stillwater, OK ||  ||  ||  ||  ||  ||  ||
|- align="center" bgcolor=""
| 51 || May 9 || West Virginia || #12 || Allie P. Reynolds Stadium • Stillwater, OK ||  ||  ||  ||  ||  ||  ||
|- align="center" bgcolor=""
| 52 || May 10 || West Virginia || #12 || Allie P. Reynolds Stadium • Stillwater, OK ||  ||  ||  ||  ||  ||  ||
|- align="center" bgcolor=""
| 53 || May 12 || at #16 Dallas Baptist || #14 || Horner Ballpark • Dallas, TX ||  ||  ||  ||  ||  ||  ||
|- align="center" bgcolor=""
| 54 || May 14 || at  || #14 || Ray Fisher Stadium • Ann Arbor, MI ||  ||  ||  ||  ||  ||  ||
|- align="center" bgcolor=""
| 55 || May 15 || at Michigan || #14 || Ray Fisher Stadium • Ann Arbor, MI ||  ||  ||  ||  ||  ||  ||
|- align="center" bgcolor=""
| 56 || May 16 || at Michigan || #14 || Ray Fisher Stadium • Ann Arbor, MI ||  ||  ||  ||  ||  ||  ||
|-

|- 
! style="background:#FF6600;color:white;"| Post-Season
|-

|- align="center"
|  ||  || TBD || || ONEOK Field • Tulsa, OK ||  ||  ||  ||  ||  ||  || 
|- align="center"
|  ||  || TBD || || ONEOK Field • Tulsa, OK ||  ||  ||  ||  ||  ||  || 
|-

All rankings from Collegiate Baseball.

Rankings

References

Oklahoma State Cowboys
Oklahoma State Cowboys baseball seasons
Oklahoma State